Gilles Néret (1933 – 3 August 2005) was a French art historian and publisher.

Early life
Born in 1933, he went to London in 1951 where he worked as a journalist for Agence France-Presse for three years.

Career
On his return to France, he worked for the magazine Constellation before going to Japan where he organized retrospectives on Auguste Renoir, Fernand Léger and Salvador Dalí before founding the Seibu museum and the Wildenstein gallery of Tokyo.

He published numerous works on the painting of Monet, Manet and Velasquez and published works on Dalí in collaboration with Robert Descharnes. Many of them are published by Taschen.

Selected publications
Klimt. Taschen, Köln, 2000. 
 Salvador Dalí: The Paintings. Taschen, Köln.
 Matisse. Taschen, Köln.
 Erotica Universalis. Taschen, Köln.

References

French art historians
French publishers (people)
1933 births
2005 deaths
20th-century French journalists